Zombie Attack is the debut album by German thrash metal band Tankard. The album was re-released in a set with another Tankard album, Chemical Invasion, in 2005.

Track listing

Personnel

Tankard
 Andreas "Gerre" Geremia – vocals
 Axel Katzmann – guitars
 Andy Bulgaropulos – guitars
 Frank Thorwarth – bass
 Oliver "O.W." Werner – drums

References

1986 debut albums
Tankard (band) albums
Noise Records albums
Albums produced by Harris Johns